{{DISPLAYTITLE:Delta1 Lyrae}}

Delta1 Lyrae, its name Latinized from δ1 Lyrae, is a binary star system in the northern constellation of Lyra. It is dimly visible to the naked eye at night with a combined apparent visual magnitude of 5.56. The system is located at a distance of approximately 1,160 light years from the Sun based on parallax, but is drifting closer with a radial velocity of −26 km/s. O. J. Eggen originally included this as a candidate member of the proposed Delta Lyrae cluster.

The variable radial velocity of this star was discovered from photographic plates taken at the Yerkes Observatory in 1904. The first set of orbital elements was computed by Frank Craig Jordan in 1916. It is a single-lined spectroscopic binary with an orbital period of 88.4 days and an eccentricity (ovalness) of 0.37.

The visible component of the pair has a blue-white hue with a stellar classification of B2.5V, indicating that it is a B-type main-sequence star undergoing core hydrogen fusion. It is a few million years old with a relatively high rotation rate and around 7–8 times the mass of the Sun. The star is radiating about 3,620 times the Sun's luminosity from its photosphere at an effective temperature of 20,350 K.

There is a magnitude 9.93 visual companion at an angular separation of  along a position angle of 20°, as of 2012. This component was discovered by William Herschel. It is an evolved giant star with a class of K2III at a distance of around 1,760 light years.

References

B-type main-sequence stars
K-type giants
Suspected variables
Spectroscopic binaries
Lyra (constellation)
Lyrae, Delta1
Durchmusterung objects
Lyrae, 11
175426
092728
7131